Greatest Hits of the 20th Century is the seventh album released by Béla Fleck and the Flecktones and their first greatest hits compilation album.

Reception 

In her Allmusic review, music critic Stacia Proefrock wrote "There isn't a dud in the bunch of this concise history of the Flecktones. An inventive blend of a world of influences, this collection offers an extremely pleasant listening experience."

Track listing
All songs by Béla Fleck unless otherwise noted.
 "The Sinister Minister" – 4:37
 "Stomping Grounds" (Victor Wooten, Fleck)– 5:26
 "Flight Of The Cosmic Hippo" – 4:28
 "Shocktime" – 4:25
 "Sex In A Pan" (Victor Wooten) – 3:34
 "The Yee-Haw Factor" – 6:58
 "Road House Blues" – 3:19
 "Vix 9" (Victor Wooten) – 4:29
 "Communication" (music: Fleck, Future Man; lyrics: Fleck)– 4:16
 "Big Country" – 5:33
 "Sunset Road" – 5:01

Personnel

The Flecktones 
 Béla Fleck - Banjo (tracks 1-3, 5, 6, 9, 11), slide banjo (track 7), Deering Crossfire electric banjo (tracks 4, 8), low-tuned Czech electric banjo (track 10), synths (tracks 4, 10), sustain pedal (track 8), Paradis Stereo Guitar with VG8 (track 9)
 Future Man - Synth-Axe Drumitar, Vocals (track 9)
 Howard Levy - Synthesizer (track 1, 3, 11), Piano (track 3, 11), Hammond B3 Organ (track 6), Harmonica (tracks 1, 5, 6), synth (track 1), harp in a cup (track 3), Güiro (track 1)
 Victor Wooten - Bass (tracks 1, 2, 4-9, 11), stereo effect (tracks  5, 8), fretless bass (tracks 3, 10)
 Jeff Coffin - Soprano Saxophone (tracks 9, 10), Alto Saxophone (track 7), Tenor Saxophone (track 10)

Guest musicians 
 Sam Bush - Mandolin on track 2 and 7, Fiddle on track 7
 Paul McCandless - soprano saxophone on track 2
 Dave Matthews - Vocals on track 9

References

Béla Fleck and the Flecktones albums
1999 greatest hits albums
Warner Records compilation albums